Tommy Edvardsen (born 26 December 1984) is a Norwegian footballer who played as a defender.

He started his youth and senior career at Vålerenga. He got fourteen Eliteserien games in 2003, scoring once. He also played in the UEFA Cup. In 2004 he only got one game, as he was loaned out to FK Haugesund for most of the season. He left Haugesund after the 2004 season, but soon found his way to Moss FK on loan. The loan was made permanent after the season.

After six seasons with Moss, Edvardsen stated that he wanted to leave the club. He was however also playing for Moss in 2010, and joined Kristiansund ahead of 2011 season, where he was a part of the team that won promotion to the First Division in 2012.

References

1984 births
Living people
Footballers from Oslo
Norwegian footballers
Vålerenga Fotball players
FK Haugesund players
Moss FK players
Kristiansund BK players
Kongsvinger IL Toppfotball players
Eliteserien players
Norwegian First Division players
Norwegian Second Division players
Association football defenders